Toipahautea is a genus of baleen whale from the Late Oligocene (Chattian) Kokoamu Greensand of New Zealand.

Classification
Phylogenetic analysis recovers Toipahautea outside crown Mysticeti but more derived than Eomysticetidae, like Horopeta and Whakakai.

Description
Diagnostic features of Toipahautea include: massive periotic; well-developed superior process of the periotic; prominent elongation of dorsomedial margin of the internal acoustic meatus; prominent fissure between the fenestra rotunda and the aperture for the cochlear aqueduct; small medial posterior sulcus; the presence of the anteroexternal foramen; the presence of the sigmoidal cavity; the presence of the elliptical foramen; horizontal sigmoidal cleft far anterior than the anterior margin of the sigmoidal process; posteromedial margin of the bulla orienting slightly anteromedially.

Paleobiology
Toipahautea has been recovered in the same deposits that have also yielded the primitive odontocetes Awamokoa, Austrosqualodon, Otekaikea, and Waipatia, the eomysticetids Matapanui, Tohoraata, Tokarahia, and Waharoa, and the balaenomorphs Mauicetus, Whakakai, and Horopeta.

References

Oligocene mammals of Oceania
Oligocene cetaceans
Extinct animals of New Zealand
Prehistoric cetacean genera